is a song by Japanese rock band Asian Kung-Fu Generation. It was released as the lead single of their eighth studio album, Wonder Future, on March 18, 2015. Single's B-side, Seaside Sleeping, sung by band's guitarist, Kensuke Kita. This is the second time since World Apart's B-side, "Uso to Wonderland" in 2006. This is the first time the band didn't use Yusuke Nakamura's artwork on their single, instead they just used the simple artwork with black color because Masafumi Gotoh imagined "Easter" as a grave and resurrection.

Song meaning 
"Easter" is about Gotoh's ironic image about Tokyo that look like ghost town and from cultural point of view, it's just a vacant lot. The title taken from  Christian festival and holiday, Easter and he hoped that there's right timing to bring us back to something once again, even if it's not festival.

Music video
The music video for "Easter" was directed by Masaki Ōkita. The video presented in black and white, features the band playing in a room with birdcages and Gotoh holding a rooster. The video ends with Gotoh cracking an egg and the curtains closed.

Track listing

Charts

References

Asian Kung-Fu Generation songs
2015 singles
Songs written by Masafumi Gotoh
2015 songs
Ki/oon Music singles
Black-and-white music videos